TemaHome is a furniture exporter based in Lisbon, Portugal.

The company's main markets are Germany, Switzerland, Portugal, Spain, Denmark and the United States. , the company exports to 40 countries.

Company history 

Founded as Norema Portuguesa in 1981 by the marriage of the Norwegian Norema SA and the Portuguese Mendes Godinho SA, it was meant to
combine the Norway's high technology with the Portuguese  affordable costs to produce furniture.

Between 1984 and 1994, the company manufactured a line of modular furniture for IKEA.

In 1995, the Norwegian partners took complete ownership of the company and started to produce kitchen, bathroom and living furniture exclusively to the Norwegian market where it maintained its own flagship stores.

In 2000, TemaHome was created through the leadership of its new major shareholder, 3i. From this point on, the ownership of the company was composed by four different stockholders, 3i  (41.50%), the Spanish MCH (25.25%), the Portuguese ESCAPITAL (25.25%) and its management team (8%).

Later in 2006, a new ownership structure was defined by a Management buy-in headed by a new management team and ownership was divided as follows: Management team (30%), Lead Capital management fund (60%) and an individual investor, Miguel Calado (10%).

By the end of 2007, the company employed over 170 workers in its staff, distribute between its Lisbon headquarters and a 16.500 Sq meters production plant in the city of Tomar.

TemaHome produces contemporary furniture and decorative accents combining modern lines and designs by some Portuguese designers such as  Filipe Alarcão.

Product range 

The range of products is composed by 3 distinct lines: essence, style and trends.
 Essence: Basic essential furnishing, ready to assembly similar to the IKEA style.
 Style: A more detailed, design oriented line of products superior in quality of materials.
 Trends: furnishing by international designers.

Design team 

The company has relied in Portuguese designer Filipe Alarcão to lead its team of in house designers. Besides Filipe, the company works independently with names like Miguel Vieira Baptista, Fernando Brizio and Jette Fyhn.

The in house team is composed by Maria Joao Maia, Délio Vicente, and Nádia Soares.

The company also works in cooperation on external designers like Marco Sousa Santos, Fernando Brizio and Miguel Vieira Batista.

Awards 

 2009 Design Management Europe Award - Medium-sized Company 
 2007 Mobis award - Best contemporary manufacturer
 2007 Leader company status - IAPMEI (Portugal institution for small and medium businesses)
 2002 Portugal Best Small and Medium businesses award
 2000 Portugal Best Small and Medium businesses award

References 

Furniture companies of Portugal
Companies based in Lisbon
Design companies established in 1981 
Portuguese companies established in 1981 
Design companies
Firms
3i Group companies
Portuguese brands